Mount Recheshnoi (also spelled Recheschnoi) is a heavily eroded stratovolcano located near the center of the SW lobe of Umnak Island in the Aleutian Islands of Alaska.

The northeast flank of Recheshnoi has one of the hottest and most extensive thermal areas in Alaska.  The Geyser Bight geothermal area consists of six zones of thermal springs and two fumarolic areas along upper Geyser Creek and contains the only known geysers in the state. In three locations in 1988 here have been found 5 active geysers up to 2 m high and 9 natural fountains up to 0.7 m high. Other thermal areas occur at Hot Springs Cove and Partov Cove on the isthmus between Recheshnoi and Mount Okmok.

The most recent eruption of Mount Recheshnoi was on the flank of the volcano around 3,000 years ago.

References

External sources
 
 Volcanoes of the Alaska Peninsula and Aleutian Islands-Selected Photographs
 
 Alaska Volcano Observatory

Landforms of Aleutians West Census Area, Alaska
Stratovolcanoes of the United States
Mountains of Alaska
Volcanoes of Alaska
Potentially active volcanoes
Aleutian Range
Umnak
Mountains of Unorganized Borough, Alaska
Volcanoes of Unorganized Borough, Alaska